A podium is a type of platform.

Podium may also refer to:

 Podium (film), a 2004 film directed by Yann Moix
 Podium (company), a US-based technology company
 Podium (genus), a genus of wasps in the family Sphecidae
 The Podium, a shopping mall in Mandaluyong, Philippines
 The Podium (Antarctica), a bluff in the Worcester Range
 The Podium, an indoor sports venue in Spokane, Washington
 Tube feet, small multipurpose appendages in echinoderms 
 Zynewave Podium, a digital audio workstation

See also 

 Podium Canada
 Podium Sans
 Lectern, a stand for written materials sometimes referred to as a podium.
  Podium buildings, composed of multiple floors of wood-framed construction over a fire-resistant "podium" floor.